The Citroën C1 is a city car marketed by Citroën from June 2005 to January 2022, originally developed as part of the B-Zero project by PSA Peugeot Citroën in a joint venture with Toyota, with two generations produced.

The C1 was developed along with two badge engineered variants, the Peugeot 107, which is mostly identical to the C1 aside from its front bumper fascia and front and rear lights, and the Toyota Aygo, which is slightly more differentiated. The three siblings debuted at the 2005 Geneva Motor Show and were manufactured at the facilities of the TPCA joint venture (Toyota Peugeot Citroën Automobile) in the city of Kolín, Czech Republic.

First generation (PM/PN; 2005) 

The C1 is powered by a 1.0 L three cylinder engine, which has a fuel economy of 61.4 mpg (UK gallons EU method; 4.6 L/100 km EU method; ca 43.4 mpg US with US method) or a 1.4 L four cylinder diesel engine which has a fuel economy of 68.9 mpg (UK gallons EU method; 4.1 L/100 km EU method; ca 48.8 mpg US with US method).

The body was designed by Donato Coco in a one-box configuration. On both the five door C1 and 107, though not the Aygo, the rear tail light cluster extends from the edge of the rear doors to the rear window, without a distinctly expressed "C-pillar".

According to the German magazine Der Spiegel, the C1 is the production car with the second-best fuel economy both among petrol engines (after the Toyota Prius) and among diesel engines (after the Smart Fortwo mhd).

In January 2010, PSA Peugeot Citroën announced that it was recalling around 100,000 of the C1 and Peugeot 107, following the worldwide recall by Toyota for a sticking accelerator pedal – which the Aygo is affected by. Under certain circumstances, the pedal can stick in a partially depressed position, or return slowly to the off position.

Trim range (United Kingdom) 
 Vibe, available in three-door or five-door, this was the basic model and the cheapest. Did not come with central locking, a rev counter, air conditioning or electric windows. Only available with the 1.0i engine.
 Rhythm, available in three-door or five-door, this trim added remote central locking, body-coloured wing mirrors, two side airbags and an engine rev counter. The 1.4 HDi diesel and the 1.0i petrol engines were both available with this trim.
 Code, available in three-door or five-door, added to the Rhythm specification by including 14 inch alloy wheels, half leather-trimmed seats, chrome interior trim inserts and a glove box cover. The 1.4 HDi diesel and the 1.0i petrol engines were both available with this trim.

Special editions (United Kingdom)
 Cool – based on the Vibe, adding air conditioning and blue seat fabrics/dashboard inserts, available in Lipizan White or Damas Blue.
 Airplay – based on the Rhythm, adding full iPod connectivity, iPod cradle, a 4 GB iPod Nano and coloured dashboard inserts and door pulls. Early models were available with bright, swirling decals. This model was originally revealed at the 2006 British International Motor Show in July 2006.

Designer Franco Sbarro created a modified C1 named the GT-C1, a design concept that follows the same theme of his previous Citroën Xsara Picasso Cup Concept. The extreme bodywork feature very wide wheels and gullwing doors alongside a modified 1.6L engine from the Citroën C2 VTS and Citroën C4 WRC-derived brakes.

In Portugal and Greece, a commercial van version called the Entreprise is offered, equipped with the 1.4L diesel engine and available only in the three-door body, for urban use. Its 107 sibling also offers an identical version.

In the United Kingdom, the now-defunct Electric Car Corporation sold an electric car based on the C1, called the Citroën C1 ev'ie from 2009 to 2012.

2009 facelift 

In January 2009, the Citroën C1 was facelifted at the same time as the Peugeot 107 and Toyota Aygo.

The updated C1 features a revised front bumper and grille, in keeping with Citroën's family look. Three new colours were also added and trim levels were also revised: basic Vibe models became 'VT', and Rhythm became 'VTR'. More durable seat fabrics were used and ventilation control graphics were updated for better legibility, and all models received new wheel trims.

A special edition "Splash" was available at launch, though this was a strictly limited edition. This was based on the basic "VT". However, it featured air conditioning, a CD player and electric front windows. The Splash model was available in Electra Blue or Lipizan White. Electra Blue came with white door mirrors, whilst Lipizan White came with glossy black door mirrors.

2012 facelift 

Citroën made a further facelift in March 2012. Changes included revised bumper, bonnet, steering wheel and CD player; LED daytime running lights, a new blue paint "Botticelli Blue", and improved fuel economy.

Two new trims were added to the facelift C1 range – Platinum and Edition, both came with alloy wheels, foglights, and a leather steering wheel and gearstick as standard while Platinum added a spoiler and chrome interior trim. VTR+ became the entry level trim when these were introduced.

From 2012 to 2014, The car was rebranded as the Citroën C1 eco for the Greek market.

Engines

Reliability 
Breakdown statistics reported by the German Automobile Club in May 2010 placed the Citroën C1 (which the data grouped with the Peugeot 107 and Toyota Aygo) at the top of the sub small car class, in respect of the low breakdown rates achieved for cars aged between one and four years. Class laggards were the Chevrolet Matiz (0–3-year-old cars) and the Smart Fortwo (4–5-year-old cars).

Safety 

The Euro NCAP score was reduced from 4 stars to 3 stars for the 2012 facelift.

Second generation (2014) 

At the 2014 Geneva Motor Show, Citroën presented a redesigned C1, also to be manufactured at a factory of the Toyota Peugeot Citroën Automobile Czech (TPCA) in a joint venture with the Peugeot 108 and Toyota Aygo. A fixed-profile cabriolet model named Airscape was introduced with a folding canvas roof, available in both 3 and 5-door configurations.

Engines

Safety

Discontinuation 
The next-generation C1 was planned to be released in March 2021 based on the TNGA-B platform, when the plan was cancelled. The TPCA joint venture announced the discontinuation of the Citroën C1 and Peugeot 108 for 2021, while the Toyota Aygo will continue to the third-generation. Production was stopped in January 2022, after almost 1.2 million vehicles were produced (both generations included).

Sales

See also 
 Citroën C1 ev'ie — an electric vehicle conversion of the C1

References

External links 

 Citroën C1 Website
 Autoexpress Citroën C1 Review

C1
Cars introduced in 2005
Cars of the Czech Republic
City cars
Euro NCAP superminis
Front-wheel-drive vehicles
Hatchbacks
2010s cars